Bosna village is located in Sitovo municipality in Silistra Province, north-eastern Bulgaria.

References

Villages in Silistra Province